Rusinovo is a village in the Berovo Municipality in North Macedonia.

Demographics
According to the 2002 census, the village had a total of 2,095 inhabitants and 710 households. Ethnic groups in the village include:

Macedonians 2092
Serbs 1
Others 2

References

External links
 Visit Macedonia

Villages in Berovo Municipality